Lynn Rippelmeyer was an airplane pilot. She was the first woman to pilot a Boeing 747. Rippelmeyer flew the 747 as a first officer for Seaboard World Airlines 1980–1981. Seaboard World merged with Flying Tiger Line in 1980.  Rippelmeyer became the first woman to captain the "jumbo jet" on a transoceanic flight while at People Express Airlines in 1984. She started her aviation career as a TWA flight attendant in 1972 before obtaining a departmental transfer as a TWA B-727 flight engineer. 

She was first officer on the first all-female crew for a scheduled commercial US carrier with Captain Emilie Jones, flying an Air Illinois, DHC-6 Twin Otter, 30 December 1977. This event was featured in the PBS documentary series We'll Meet Again with Ann Curry on Jan 8, 2019. In 1982 at People Express, Rippelmeyer was a co-captain on the first all female Boeing 737 crew. People Express merged with Continental which later merged with United Airlines.  At United, she trained on the B-787 Dreamliner before retiring in 2013.  Captain Rippelmeyer's uniforms were placed in the Smithsonian Institution, the San Diego Air and Space Museum, and the Monroe County Historical Museum. She was named a Woman of the Year in England (1984), inducted into the International Forest of Friendship by Betty Gillies, a WWII WASP and original 99; mentioned in Who's Who of American Women 1983–1984, and was featured in a BBC documentary, Reaching for the Skies Episode: 2 "The Adventure of Flight",

Early life

Rippelmeyer was born and raised on a farm in Valmeyer, Illinois. She attended University of Illinois to earn a teaching degree in English worked as a student teacher in a Chicago inner-city school. Rippelmeyer began her career in aviation as a TWA flight attendant in 1972. Her interest in flying took hold when friends who were flight instructors offered lessons in a Piper J-3 Cub seaplane in Vermont. She obtained her required certificates and training at Tamiami Airport in Miami where she worked as a flight instructor and charter pilot.

Career

While working for TWA as a flight attendant part time and as a flight instructor/charter pilot, she was hired by Air Illinois in 1977 as a Twin Otter DHC-6 First Officer. After being told they could not fly together,  due to inclement weather and the inability of the designated flight crew to make it to the airport on December 30, 1977, Rippelmeyer and Captain Emilie Jones were permitted to fly the scheduled turboprop commuter plane under the condition that the passengers were not made aware the pilots were both women. This was the first all-female crew of a scheduled flight in the United States.

In 1984, Rippelmeyer became the first woman to captain a Boeing 747 across an ocean. Prior to this milestone, Rippelmeyer had been involved with transatlantic flights as a flight attendant and as a B-747 pilot for the cargo airline, Seaboard World Airlines in 1980–1981. The 1984 People Express flight was the first time a woman held the reins as Captain of this flight. Rippelmeyer acknowledged that the  departure from Newark, New Jersey was uneventful.  However, upon arrival in England, she was welcomed by reporters, magazine writers, and photographers due to the rarity of female pilots. Photos from this event were shared among newspapers across the world. Captain Rippelmeyer is the first American to have received this honor.

Retirement
The non-profit organization ROSE (ROatan Support Effort) was founded in September 2017.

Bringing hope of a better life to the people of Roatan and Honduras, Rippelmeyer founded ROSE after flying daily commercial flights into Tegucigalpa, Honduras.  Passengers often included missionaries and medical teams.  She mad with the people of Roatan who were by creating and supporting health care clinics, schools, sports programs and an animal shelter.  After witnessing the island's needs she began bringing supplies in on her flights, during her days off and while on vacation.  ROSE helps to collect, transport and deliver donated supplies to qualifying local non-governmental organizations, groups and programs that bring medical, dental & vision health care, education and meals them.

 Rippelmeyer lived near Houston, Texas.

References

External links

 
 Gant, Kelli (June 2001). "Women in Aviation" (PDF). Flight Attendant News: pg11-12.

Living people
Year of birth missing (living people)
American women aviators
21st-century American women